Hillary Bor (born November 22, 1989) is a Kenyan-born American track and field athlete. He qualified for the 2016 Olympics by finishing in second place in the 3000 meters steeplechase at the 2016 United States Olympic Trials.

Bor attended Arnesens High School south of Eldoret, where he ran a 9:15 steeplechase and was district champion in the long jump and pole vault.  He also ran a 3:55 1500 meters in high school.

In 2007 he won a scholarship to Iowa State University, where he placed fourth in the steeplechase at the 2008 NCAA Championships in 8:36.84 earning All-American status.  He improved that to second place in 2009 and added an Academic All American status to another All American improving his personal best to 8:35.12.  In 2010 he finished third at the NCAAs. His senior year earned him second team Academic All American.

His older brothers Emmanuel and Julius Bor also ran for an American college, the University of Alabama.  The brothers found a path to citizenship in the country of their education by joining the United States Army.  While serving on different bases, the three teamed up to win the All Armed Forces Cross Country Championships in February 2016.  All three were in the top 20 of the USA Cross Country Championships, Hillary finishing eighth.

Bor's time of 8:30.70 in the steeplechase at the April 2016 Stanford Invitational was the world leading time at that point of the season.  At the Olympic Trials, Bor was running in fifth place well behind Evan Jager's lead position.  Another Kenyan-American, Stanley Kebenei was the closest to Jager but began to fade as Bor, Andy Bayer and Donn Cabral were chasing.  The diminutive Bor made up over ten meters on the backstretch and had passed Cabral before the water jump.  As he passed Bayer on the outside their two elbows made contact.  On the outside, Bor was clean over the water jump and off to the races after Jager, on the inside Kebenei was unable to find his way out of the pit and fell onto all fours, causing Cabral to have to make an extra barrier jump over his body while Bayer sidestepped the fall but was losing ground chasing Bor.  Perhaps angered by the incident, Cabral took off sprinting, catching Bayer who was unable to respond and tied up going into the finish.  Bor's last lap was the fastest of the field.  His time of 8:24.10 was a new personal best.  After the race, the Nike Bowerman team filed a protest against Bor (the only non-Nike athlete in the final five) that was unsuccessful.

In 2017, he competed in the men's 3000 metres steeplechase at the 2017 World Athletics Championships held in London, United Kingdom.

References

External links
U.S. Army World Class Athlete Program profile

1989 births
Living people
American male steeplechase runners
American military Olympians
Athletes (track and field) at the 2016 Summer Olympics
Iowa State Cyclones men's track and field athletes
Kenyan emigrants to the United States
Kenyan male steeplechase runners
Olympic track and field athletes of the United States
People from Uasin Gishu County
United States Army soldiers
World Athletics Championships athletes for the United States
Iowa State Cyclones men's cross country runners
USA Outdoor Track and Field Championships winners
Athletes (track and field) at the 2020 Summer Olympics
U.S. Army World Class Athlete Program